Fajr nafl prayer (dawn supererogatory prayer) is an Islamic prayer (salat) that is performed after the second adhan of dawn and before Fajr (dawn-time prayer).

Presentation
The supererogatory or optional dawn prayer is a pair of rakats which are offered to God (Allah) Almighty just before performing the obligatory Fajr prayer which is fard.

This Fajr nafilah is included in the prayers of regular Nafl prayers (ar - صلاة النافلة), which are the Sunnah prayers that follow the five obligatory prayers.

This supererogatory is performed before the obligatory dawn prayer, is classified as a confirmed Sunnah according to Islamic legal evidence, is made of two rakates before the Fajr prayer are sealed with one taslim, and Muhammad used to preserve it in his home, in his travel, and advise his companions (Sahaba) to pray it.

Muhammad confirmed it by doing it when he was not traveling, and even when he was on the move, as he preserved it and never left it, and encouraged it in the hadith that Imam Muslim ibn al-Hajjaj narrated in his book Sahih Muslim within the chapter on :

Imam Al-Tabarani also narrated in his book Al-Mu'jam al-Kabir another hadith about the encouragement of this supererogatory, which reads:

See also
Fajr prayer
Dawn
Adhan
Witr

References

Salah
Salah terminology